Tomáš Houdek may refer to:
 Tomáš Houdek (ice hockey)
 Tomáš Houdek (darts player)